The Prix Nocturne is a French literary prize founded in 1962 by Roland Stragliati and revived in 2006 by the review "Le nouvel Attila".  It is awarded each November to recognise fantastic or unusual works.

Winners
 1962 - Leo Perutz, Le Marquis de Bolibar (Albin Michel, 1930)
 1963 - Bruno Schulz, Le Traité des mannequins (Éditions Julliard, 1961)
 1966 - Hugues Rebell, Les Nuits chaudes du Cap français (La Plume, 1902)
 2006 - Giovanni Papini, Gog (Flammarion, 1932)
 2007 - Ramon Sender, Noces Rouges (Seghers, 1947)
 2008 - Miodrag Bulatovic, Le coq rouge (Seuil, 1963)
 2009 - André Laurie, Spiridon le muet (Rouff, 1908)
 2010 - Ermanno Cavazzoni, Cirenaica (Einaudi, 1999)
 2011 - Ludvik Vaculik, Les Cobayes (Gallimard, 1974)
 2013 - André de Richaud, La Nuit aveuglante (Robert Morel, 1966)

References

French literary awards
Awards established in 1962
Fantasy awards
1962 establishments in France